We Live is the fifth studio album by English doom metal band Electric Wizard, released in 2004. It is the first recorded material with the band's second line-up. Due to the addition of second guitarist Liz Buckingham, the songs are more complex than their previous work.

They are named "The Electric Wizard" for the first time on the album cover, and "Electric Wizard II" in the booklet. The booklet also contains the statement: "My enemies, I fear not...but God protect me from my friends".

History
In August 2003, vocalist-guitarist Jus Oborn revealed Electric Wizard's new line-up – drummer Justin Greaves, second-guitarist Liz Buckingham (of 13 and Sourvein), and bassist Rob Al-Issa This new line-up recorded the album in July 2003, just days after Buckingham began rehearsing with the band. As Oborn explained, the addition of Buckingham was crucial given the departure of his previous writing partner, Tim Bagshaw:

Album information
For this release, Electric Wizard continued to be inspired by horror movies. "Eko Eko Azarak" is the title of the first in a series of Japanese horror movies directed by Shimako Sato, while "Tutti I Colori Del Buio" and "Living Dead at Manchester Morgue" are named after a 1972 Sergio Martino movie and a 1974 Jorge Grau horror movie, respectively. Furthermore, the track "We Live" samples dialog from Don Sharp's 1973 horror film Psychomania.

Critical reception

Upon release, We Live received mostly positive reviews from music critics, with Eduardo Rivadavia of Allmusic writing "2004's We Live witnessed the birth of Electric Wizard Mark II, as lone remaining founding member Jus Oborn – tired of years of internal strife – decided to "upgrade" the doom metal stalwarts from a power trio to a twin-guitar quartet. However, with or without the cosmetic improvement brought on by the addition of second guitarist Liz Buckingham, it's important to point out that this incarnation of Electric Wizard has little in common with the original article of ten years prior."

Track listing

CD

2006 reissue bonus track

12" vinyl

Disc 1
Side one

Side two

Disc 2
Side one

Side two

Personnel
 Jus Oborn - guitar, vocals
 Liz Buckingham - guitar
 Rob Al-Issa - bass
 Justin Greaves - drums
 Tony R. - artwork
 All lyrics - Jus Oborn
 All music - Electric Wizard

Release history

References

2004 albums
Electric Wizard albums
Rise Above Records albums
Candlelight Records albums
JVC Records albums